The 1976 United States Senate election in Maine took place on November 2, 1976. Incumbent Democratic senator Edmund Muskie won re-election to a fourth term.

General election

Candidates
Edmund Muskie (D), incumbent U.S. Senator
Robert A. G. Monks (R), shareholder activist

Results

See also 
 1976 United States Senate elections

References

Maine
1976
1976 Maine elections